Mike Hercus (born June 5, 1979) is a former professional rugby union player who played at fly-half for the United States national team and several top level professional clubs around the globe.

Hercus is the USA Eagles' all-time leading scorer with 465 points, and is the leading scorer for the U.S. in Rugby World Cups with 77 points.
At the time of his final match, Hercus was the Eagles' all-time most capped back.

Early life and career
Hercus was born in Falls Church, Virginia, but his parents returned to their native Australia where he was brought up and educated at Shore School in North Sydney. He started in their first XV for two years and was captained by Phil Waugh when they were in year 12. He played for the Australian schoolboys rugby union team and later progressed to the Australian under 21 side.

Rugby career

2003–2007
The American national team, the USA Eagles, gave him a route into international rugby union. Hercus made his debut for the U.S. national team in 2002. Hercus played in the 2003 Rugby World Cup, scoring 51 points for the Eagles.

Hercus played at Sale Sharks for two seasons as Charlie Hodgson's understudy before moving to Llanelli Scarlets. There Hercus was able to secure a starting position at fly-half during the season, a position which he maintained in the 2006 Powergen Cup final (which saw the Scarlets lose to London Wasps 26-10). Hercus moved to the Newport Gwent Dragons in the summer of 2006 when it was announced that Welsh international fly-half Stephen Jones was to move to the Scarlets.

Also in 2006, Hercus received an invitation to play for the prestigious Barbarians FC, joining an elite list of only seven USA Eagles who have done so. His Barbarians cap came in the annual clash vs. Leicester Tigers in which he scored 17 points, including a try.

2007–2010
Hercus captained the Eagles in their qualifying matches against Uruguay in 2006 for the 2007 Rugby World Cup. He returned to the US for the start of the 2007 U.S. Rugby Super League season, where he played for Belmont Shore and was in the US Falcons NA4 squad. Hercus started all four matches for the U.S. in the 2007 Rugby World Cup.

Hercus signed a contract at the start of 2008 to play for Japanese club IBM Big Blue. In 2009, after just one season, Hercus signed with the Australian club Sunshine Coast Stingrays where, in limited action he was the club's leading scorer. Hercus played with the USA Eagles during the 2009 summer internationals, including the Eagles against Canada and Uruguay in the 2011 Rugby World Cup qualifying matches. These qualifying matches in 2009 were Hercus's last matches for the U.S. national team.

In 2010, Hercus returned to Australia and his junior club the Gordon Highlanders to compete in the Shute Shield. Hercus was named Gordon's captain to start the season, but saw limited action due to injury. By mid season, rumors began to leak out that he had retired or intended to retire from both international and club rugby due to persistent reoccurring injuries. Although no official announcement has ever been made, he has been presumed retired since summer 2010.

Personal life
Hercus is married to TV presenter Natalie Michaels.

References

 https://web.archive.org/web/20091115112801/http://www.rugbymag.com/news/national-teams/men/stats-and-milestones-for-usa-v-uruguay.aspx
 http://www.usarugby.org/
 https://web.archive.org/web/20100313081855/http://www.eaglesxv.com/players/mike-hercus
 https://web.archive.org/web/20091014215817/http://www.scru.com.au/content.php?id=20&category=stingrays
 https://web.archive.org/web/20110724020906/http://www.barbarianfc.co.uk/player-archive/profile/3930/mike-hercus

External links
Stats from The Scarlets
Stats from Newport Gwent Dragons
Stats from Sunshine Coast Stingrays

1979 births
Living people
American rugby union players
Rugby union fly-halves
Expatriate rugby union players in Japan
American emigrants to Australia
Sale Sharks players
Scarlets players
Dragons RFC players
People from Falls Church, Virginia
People educated at Sydney Church of England Grammar School
United States international rugby union players
American expatriate rugby union players
Expatriate rugby union players in Wales
American expatriate sportspeople in Wales
American expatriate sportspeople in Japan
American expatriate sportspeople in England
Expatriate rugby union players in England
Sportspeople from Virginia
Rugby union players from Sydney
American people of Australian descent